The East Germany men's national field hockey team represented East Germany in men's international field hockey competitions.

The team participated once at the Olympic Games when it finished in 11th place at the 1968 edition.

Tournament record

Summer Olympics
1968 – 11th place

Friendship Games
1984 – 4th place

See also
East Germany women's national field hockey team
Germany men's national field hockey team

References

European men's national field hockey teams
National team
Former national field hockey teams
Field hockey